Vermicularia is a genus of sea snails, marine gastropod mollusks in the family Turritellidae.

Species
Species within the genus Vermicularia include:
 Vermicularia bathyalis Petuch, 2002
 Vermicularia fargoi Olsson, 1951
 Vermicularia frisbeyae McLean, 1970
 Vermicularia gracilis (Maltzan, 1883)
 Vermicularia knorrii (Deshayes, 1843)
 Vermicularia lumbricalis (Linnaeus, 1758)
 Vermicularia maoriana Powell, 1937
 Vermicularia pellucida (Broderip & Sowerby, 1829)
 Vermicularia radicula (Stimpson, 1851)
 Vermicularia spirata (Philippi, 1836)
 Vermicularia tenuis (Rousseau in Chenu, 1843)
 Vermicularia tortuosa (Lightfoot, 1786)
Species brought into synonymy
 Vermicularia fewkesi (Yates, 1890): synonym of Vermicularia pellucida eburnea (Reeve, 1842)

References

 Mørch O. A. (1861-1862). Review of the Vermetidae. Proceedings of the Zoological Society of London (1861) 2: 145-181 (September 1861) 3 page(s): 169

Turritellidae